Farnham Cricket Club is based at Farnham in Surrey. It was founded in 1782 and for many years was a senior club due to the strength of its team, which featured Billy Beldham and John Wells. Farnham is a member of the Surrey Championship in the twenty-first century, with its first team now playing in the league's third tier Division II. The club's home stadium is at Folly Hill, on the outskirts of Farnham, directly below Farnham Castle.

History

1780s
Beldham and Wells families were instrumental in the club's formation. They featured Billy Beldham and John Wells, brothers-in-law who went on to become two of England's most famous footballers. Farnham's first known match, which they won, occurred on 13 August 1782 at Odiham. Their team included J. Wells (probably James Wells, elder brother of John) and two players called Beldham, spelled "Beldum" on the surviving scorecard. One was almost certainly George Beldham, Billy's elder brother, and the other was probably Billy himself, then aged sixteen.

There are no records of Farnham matches from 1783, and only one from 1784. That was against Odiham & Alton at Holt Pound Oval which is just across the county boundary in Hampshire. However, several Surrey matches were played there after it opened in 1784 as Farnham's home ground. The land belonged to Lord Stawell (1757–1820), who was a Hambledon Club member and a Farnham player. He commissioned the Beldhams to lay out the cricket pitch. The match against Odiham & Alton was arranged for 30 July 1784, but there is no post-match report. The teams are known and Farnham included Stawell and the Beldham brothers. A return match was arranged at Odiham Down on 4 August but the result is unknown.

Farnham played several matches in 1785 against opponents including Alresford and a team called Petworth, Northchapel & Tillington with six of Hambledon. That was followed by three matches against Hambledon for a purse of £100. In the first match at Holt Pound, Farnham were well beaten by an innings and 119 runs. The other two matches were played at Windmill Down but records have been lost. These were played, though, because Billy Beldham recalled them when he was interviewed by James Pycroft in 1837. Farnham won at least one, and possibly both.

In June 1786, Hambledon declined a challenge from Farnham. On 28 July 1786, Farnham were scheduled to play against "seven of Hambledon with four picked men from Sussex" on Northchapel Green, near Chichester, but again the result has not been found. In other matches in 1786, Farnham played against Berkshire, Warfield (twice), a Guildford & Godalming XXII, and a Godalming XII with four of Hambledon.

Later years
Other famous players associated with Farnham have been Julius Caesar and Graham Thorpe. The club celebrated its bi-centenary in 1982.

References

Further reading
 
 
 
 
 
 
 

Cricket in Surrey
English club cricket teams
English cricket teams in the 18th century
Farnham
Former senior cricket clubs
Sports clubs established in the 1780s